The urethral or periurethral glands (also Littré glands after Alexis Littré) are glands that branch off the wall of the urethra of mammals. The glands secrete mucus and are most numerous in the section of the urethra that runs through the penis. Urethral glands produce a colloid secretion containing glycosaminoglycans; this secretion protects the epithelium against urine.

Untreated urethritis can lead to infection of the urethral glands, which can in turn result in impeding urethral strictures.

References

External links
 Slide at uottawa.ca

Mammal male reproductive system
Male urethra